A Picardy third, also known as a Picardy cadence or Tierce de Picardie, is a major chord of the tonic at the end of a musical section that is either modal or in a minor key. This is achieved by raising the third of the expected minor triad by a semitone to create a major triad, as a form of resolution.

For example, instead of a cadence ending on an A minor chord containing the notes A, C, and E, a Picardy third ending would consist of an A major chord containing the notes A, C, and E. The minor third between the A and C of the A minor chord has become a major third in the Picardy third chord.

Philosopher Peter Kivy writes:

According to Deryck Cooke, "Western composers, expressing the 'rightness' of happiness by means of a major third, expressed the 'wrongness' of grief by means of the minor third, and for centuries, pieces in a minor key had to have a 'happy ending' – a final major chord (the 'tierce de Picardie') or a bare fifth."

As a harmonic device, the Picardy third originated in Western music in the Renaissance era.

Illustration

What makes this a Picardy cadence is shown by the red natural sign. Instead of the expected B-flat (which would make the chord minor) the accidental gives us a B natural, making the chord major.

History

Name
The term was first used in 1768 by Jean-Jacques Rousseau, although the device was used in music centuries earlier. Rousseau argues  that “the term is used jokingly by musicians”, suggesting it might have never had an academic basis, a tangible origin, and might have sprung out of idiomatic jokes in France in the first half of the 18th century. But his attempt at explaining why this term was used remains unconvincing: “the [practice] remained longer in Church Music, and, consequently, in Picardy, where there is music in a lot of cathedrals and churches”.
 
Robert Hall hypothesizes that, instead of deriving from the Picardy region of France, it comes from the Old French word "picart", meaning "pointed" or "sharp" in northern dialects, and thus refers to the musical sharp that transforms the minor third of the chord into a major third.

The few Old French dictionaries in which the word picart (fem. picarde) appears give “aigu,
piquant” as a definition. While piquant is quite straightforward — meaning spiky, pointy, sharp — aigu is much more ambiguous, because it has the inconvenience of having at least three meanings: “high-pitched/treble”, “sharp” as in a sharp blade, and “acute”. Considering the definitions also state the term can refer to a nail ("clou") (read masonry nail), a pike or a spit, it seems aigu might be there used to mean "pointy" / “sharp”. However, not “sharp” in the desired sense, the one relating to a raised pitch, but in the sense of a sharp blade, which would thus completely discredit the word picart as the origin for the Picardy third, which also seems unlikely considering the possibility that aigu was also used to refer to a high(er)-pitched note, and a treble sound, thus perfectly explaining the use of the word picarde to designate a chord whose third is higher than it should be.

Not to be ignored is the existence of the proverb "ressembler le Picard" ("to resemble an inhabitant of Picard") which meant “éviter le danger” (to avoid danger). This would link back to the humorous character of the term, that would have thus been used to mock supposedly cowardly composers who used the Picardy third as a way to avoid the gravity of the minor third, and perhaps the backlash they would have faced from the academic elite and the Church by going against the time’s scholasticism.

Ultimately, the origin of the name tierce picarde will likely never be known for sure, but what evidence there is seems to point towards these idiomatic jokes and proverbs as well as the literal meaning of picarde as high-pitched and treble.

Use
In medieval music, such as that of Machaut, neither major nor minor thirds were considered stable intervals, and so cadences were typically on open fifths. As a harmonic device, the Picardy third originated in Western music in the Renaissance era. By the early seventeenth century, its use had become established in practice in music that was both sacred (as in the Schütz example above) and secular:

Examples of the Picardy third can be found throughout the works of J. S. Bach and his contemporaries, as well as earlier composers such as Thoinot Arbeau and John Blow. Many of Bach's minor key chorales end with a cadence featuring a final chord in the major:

In his book Music and Sentiment, Charles Rosen shows how Bach makes use of the fluctuations between minor and major to convey feeling in his music. Rosen singles out the Allemande from the keyboard Partita No. 1 in B-flat, BWV 825 to exemplify "the range of expression then possible, the subtle variety of inflections of sentiment contained with a well-defined framework". The following passage from the first half of the piece starts in F major, but then, in bar 15, "Turning to the minor mode with a chromatic bass and then back to the major for the cadence adds still new intensity."

Many passages in Bach's religious works follow a similar expressive trajectory involving major and minor keys that may sometimes take on a symbolic significance. For example, David Humphreys (1983, p. 23) sees the "languishing chromatic inflections, syncopations and appoggiaturas" of the following episode from the St Anne Prelude for organ, BWV 552 from Clavier-Übung III as "showing Christ in his human aspect. Moreover the poignant angularity of the melody, and in particular the sudden turn to the minor, are obvious expressions of pathos, introduced as a portrayal of his Passion and crucifixion":

Notably, Bach's two books of The Well-Tempered Clavier, composed in 1722 and 1744 respectively, differ considerably in their application of Picardy thirds, which occur unambiguously at the end of all of the minor-mode preludes and all but one of the minor-mode fugues in the first book. In the second book, however, fourteen of the minor-mode movements end on a minor chord, or occasionally, on a unison. Manuscripts vary in many of these cases.

While the device was used less frequently during the Classical era, examples can be found in works by Haydn and Mozart, such as the slow movement of Mozart's Piano Concerto 21, K. 467:

Philip Radcliffe says that the dissonant harmonies here "have a vivid foretaste of Schumann and the way they gently melt into the major key is equally prophetic of Schubert". At the end of his opera Don Giovanni, Mozart uses the switch from minor to major to considerable dramatic effect: "As the Don disappears, screaming in agony, the orchestra settles in on a chord of D major. The change of mode offers no consolation, though: it is more like the tierce de Picardie, the 'Picardy third' (a famous misnomer derived from tierce picarte, 'sharp third'), the major chord that was used to end solemn organ preludes and toccatas in the minor keys in days of old."

The fierce C minor drama that pervades the Allegro con brio ed appassionato movement from Beethoven's last Piano Sonata, Op. 111, dissipates as the prevailing tonality turns to the major in its closing bars "in conjunction with a concluding diminuendo to end the movement, somewhat unexpectedly, on a note of alleviation or relief".

The switch from minor to major was a device used frequently and to great expressive effect by Schubert in both his songs and instrumental works. In his book on the song cycle Winterreise, singer Ian Bostridge speaks of the "quintessentially Schubertian effect in the final verse" of the opening song "Gute Nacht", "as the key shifts magically from minor to major".

Susan Wollenberg describes how the first movement of Schubert's Fantasia in F minor for piano four-hands, D 940, "ends in an extended Tierce de Picardie". The subtle change from minor to major occurs in the bass at the beginning of bar 103:

In the Romantic era, those of Chopin's nocturnes that are in a minor key almost always end with a Picardy third. A notable structural employment of this device occurs with the finale of the Tchaikovsky Fifth Symphony, where the motto theme makes its first appearance in the major mode.

Interpretation
According to James Bennighof: "Replacing an expected final minor chord with a major chord in this way is a centuries-old technique—the raised third of the chord, in this case G rather than G natural, was first dubbed a 'Picardy third' (tierce de Picarde) in print by Jean-Jacques Rousseau in 1797 ... to express [the idea that] hopefulness might seem unremarkable, or even clichéd."

Notable examples
 The Christian hymn tune "Picardy", often sung with the text "Let All Mortal Flesh Keep Silence", is based on a French carol from the 17th century or earlier. It is in a minor key, but the final chord is changed to major on the final verse.
(Unknown) – "Coventry Carol" (written not later than 1591). Modern harmonisations of this carol include the famously distinctive finishing major Picardy third in the melody, but the original 1591 harmonisation went much further with this device, including Picardy thirds at seven of the twelve tonic cadences notated, including all three such cadences in its chorus.
The Beatles – "I'll Be Back", from the soundtrack album of the film A Hard Day's Night. Ian MacDonald speaks of the way "Lennon is harmonised by McCartney in shifting major and minor thirds, resolving on a Picardy third at the end of the first and second verses".
Beethoven – Hammerklavier, slow movement
Brahms – Piano Trio No. 1, scherzo
Sarah Connor – "From Sarah with Love", final cadence
Coots and Gillespie, "You Go to My Head". Ted Gioia describes the song as starting "in the major key, but from the second bar onward, Mr. Coots seems intent on creating a feverish dream quality tending more to the minor mode" before finally reaching a cadence in the major.
Dvořák – New World Symphony, finale
Bob Dylan – "Ain't Talkin', the final song on Modern Times (2006), is played in E minor but ends (and ends the album) with a ringing E major chord.
Roberta Flack – "Killing Me Softly with His Song" ending and resolution. According to Flack: "My classical background made it possible for me to try a number of things with [the song's arrangement]. I changed parts of the chord structure and chose to end on a major chord. [The song] wasn't written that way."
Oliver Nelson – "Stolen Moments", from the 1961 album The Blues and the Abstract Truth; Ted Gioia sees "the brief resolve into the tonic major in bar four of the melody" as "a clever hook... one of the many interesting twists" in this jazz composition. 
Joni Mitchell – "Tin Angel", from Clouds (1969); the Picardy third lands on the lyric "I found someone to love today". According to Katherine Monk, the Picardy third in this song, "suggests Mitchell is internally aware of romantic love's inability to provide true happiness but, gosh darn it, it's a nice illusion all the same."
Donna Summer – “I Feel Love” (1977) alternates throughout with an accompaniment of "synth swirls: major and minor; it’s basically a version of what Franz Schubert did for his whole career."
The Fireballs – "Vaquero", This (1961) Tex-Mex instrumental composed by George Tomsco and Norman Petty is clearly in the key of E minor, and yet ends with a ringing E Major chord."
Hall & Oates – "Maneater"; each verse has a Picardy third in the middle, moving from a major seventh in the second measure to a flat second in the third measure, and finally ending on a major first in the fourth measure. In the song's original key of B minor, this is an A major chord to a C major chord, ending on a B major chord.
The Turtles – "Happy Together" (1967) alternates between major and minor keys with the last chord of the outro featuring a Picardy third.

See also
List of major/minor compositions

References

Further reading
Latham, Alison (ed.). 2002. "Tierce de Picardie (Fr., ‘Picardy 3rd’)". The Oxford Companion to Music. Oxford and New York: Oxford University Press. .
 Ruff, Lillian M. 1972. "Josquin Des Pres: Some Features of His Motets". The Consort: Annual Journal of the Dolmetsch Foundation 28:106–18.
 Rushton, Julian. 2001. "Tierce de Picardie [Picardy 3rd]". The New Grove Dictionary of Music and Musicians, second edition, edited by Stanley Sadie and John Tyrrell. London: Macmillan Publishers.
 Rutherford-Johnson, Tim, Michael Kennedy, and Joyce Bourne Kennedy (eds.). 2012. "Tierce de Picardie". The Oxford Dictionary of Music, sixth edition. Oxford and New York: Oxford University Press. .

Cadences
Chords
Intervals (music)
Musical techniques